Friedrichs Bridge (German: Friedrichsbrücke) is a bridge in Berlin, one of several crossing the Spree between Museum Island and the mainland portion of Mitte. It connects Anna-Louisa-Karsch-Straße with Bodestraße. Since its creation in 1703, the bridge has been repeatedly renovated. It is considered a protected monument.

Timeline 
Here is a brief historical overview of the bridge:
 1703: Construction of a wooden bridge known as the Great Bridge to Pomeranze
 1769: Construction of a vaulted brick bridge with a flap in the middle
 1792: Renamed Friedrich's Bridge after King Frederick the Great of Prussia
 1823: Replacement of vault and bridge flap by cast iron Tudor arches
 1893–1894: Bridge completely rebuilt to achieve higher headroom required by shipping. Obelisks added at bridge ends; widened to 
 1945: Blasted by the Wehrmacht
 1950–1951: Construction of temporary wooden bridge
 1981: Construction of a  prestressed concrete frame bridge as footbridge without river piers spanning 
 2012–present: Reconstruction of the bridge on the historical width of

References

External links
 

Bridges in Berlin
Buildings and structures in Mitte